Gábor Kovács (born 23 October 1987 in Ajka) is a Hungarian striker who currently plays for Zalaegerszegi TE.

External links 
 HLSZ 

1987 births
Living people
People from Ajka
Hungarian footballers
Association football forwards
FC Ajka players
Zalaegerszegi TE players
Sportspeople from Veszprém County